Košarkaški klub Radnički, commonly referred to as Radnički Kragujevac or SPD Radnički, is a men's professional basketball club based in Kragujevac, Serbia, and a part of a multi-sports company SPD Radnički. They are currently competing in the Second Basketball League of Serbia (2nd-tier).

History 

The club was founded in October 2015 as KKK Radnički (full name: Kragujevački košarkaški klub Radnički), and a former basketball player and Kragujevac-born Nikola Lončar became the club president.

Napredak Rubin, which competed in the Basketball League of Serbia in the 2016–17 season, changed the tier with the Radnički for 2017–18 season. By approval from the Basketball Federation of Serbia, Napredak moved to the 3rd-tier First Regional League (West).

Since 2019, the club has been a part of multi-sports club SPD Radnički, based in Kragujevac.

Players 

 Mihailo Jovičić
 Đorđe Milosavljević

Season by season

Source: Srbijasport

Coaching history 

  Nenad Milojević (2015–2016)
  Zoran Milovanović (August 2016 – April 2017)
  Darko Brajković (2017)
  Zoran Todorović (2017)
  Bojan Kusmuk (2017–2018)
  Igor Todorović (2018–2021)
  Ivica Vukotić (2021–2022)
  Filip Socek (2022)
  Stevan Mijović (2022–present)

References

External links
  
 
 Team Profile at eurobasket.com

 
SPD Radnički
Sport in Kragujevac
Basketball teams in Serbia
Basketball teams established in 2015
2015 establishments in Serbia